Lhachen Naglug  (Lha-chen-Nag-lug) (c. 1110 -1140) was a Dard ruler of Ladakh. He is mentioned in the Ladakhi Chronicles. During his reign, buildings such as the palace at Wanla Palace and the Khala Tse Castle were built.

References

Kings of Ladakh
1110s births
1140 deaths